Brain Challenge is a mental exercise video game, featuring "brain exercise puzzles". The game was developed by Gameloft Beijing for mobile phones and iPods and released on September 5, 2007. In 2008 was followed by a Nintendo DS version on January 8, an Xbox Live Arcade release on March 12, and a PlayStation 3 launch on November 27. The N-Gage 2.0 version was released on the day of the service's launch, April 3, 2008. A version for WiiWare was released in autumn 2008 on all three regions. The Wii version also uses Miis for the players profile. OnLive also had launched their new streaming game platform with Brain Challenge on July 27, 2010. The game was released for Mac OS X in January 2011.

Gameplay
The game is also structured like Big Brain Academy in that puzzles are divided into four separate categories: Logic, Math, Visual, and Focus; the Xbox Live Arcade version, PlayStation 3, PSP, Wii, Nintendo DS, and PC add a fifth category, Memory. The puzzles can be played at three difficulty levels and more complex puzzles are unlocked through a player's progression through the game.

Many of the puzzles are similar to those from both Big Brain Academy and Brain Age. For example, Balance shows different objects on scales, and the player must determine from the relationships on the scales which is the heaviest object. In the Trout Route test, the player must follow a path based on the progressive numerical relationship given (i.e. +2, -3, etc.). Travelling requires the player to memorize a route of arrows, while Ascending has the player determining the order of a group of objects from least to most in amount. Bouncing Ball has the player determining as quick as possible which ball bounces highest.

Game modes
The game features two modes:
Test: The difficulty level automatically adjusts throughout the game based on performance. 
Free Training (Training Room on the XBLA version): Allows the player to select exercises of their choice at three available levels (Easy, Medium, Hard).

The XBLA, PlayStation 3, and Nintendo DS versions also feature additional modes:
Creative (available on PS3 with an add-on pack): A relaxing mode in which the player can doodle drawings or shoot fireworks.
Stress: A more stressful test mode than the basic Test mode, which adds distracting noises and visuals, such as forcing the player to do two disparate actions at once, or dealing with distracting images or insects on the screen. It is also playable on the PlayStation 3.
Kid mode (available on PS3 with an add-on pack): A multiplayer mode that allows younger players to play.
Personal coach: A user-selected AI coach that accompanies the player through various modes.
Brain charts: Detailed stats and graphs tracking past gameplay.

Multiplayer
The Nintendo DS version supports up to three player multiplayer via the Nintendo Wi-Fi Connection, while the Xbox Live Arcade, PlayStation Network, and OnLive versions features up to four player offline and online Xbox Live multiplayer, as well as online leaderboards. The mobile phone version also features an online leaderboard.

Reception

The mobile phone and iPod versions were very well received, including an 8.3/10 from IGN for the wireless version, which praised "[the] majority of the puzzles are good and the production values are strong". Pocket Gamer raved about the iPod version in its 8 of 10 review: "It's almost a no-brainer to recommend Brain Challenge. It's enjoyable, invigorating and there's a remarkable amount [of gameplay] in it".

IGN's review for the Nintendo DS version was less enthusiastic, but still singled out the Stress Test as an innovative twist to the brain exercise game formula, as was its review of the Xbox Live Arcade version, though it did mention that "there's quite a bit of depth to Brain Challenge... Making your way through Brain Challenge could take a very, very long time". DS Fanboy's review was more generous with an 8/10 review, and while calling it "an odd little game", it praised "lots of replay value, interesting unlockables, and loads of content make up for the title's flaws".

Team Xbox panned the Xbox Live Arcade version in its 4/10 review: "It doesn't take a whole lot of brain power to figure out that this is one title best left on the shelf". GameSpot's negative review (5.5/10) was: "...Only a handful of these stand-alone minigames resemble anything of interest".

Sequels
A sequel, Brain Challenge Vol. 2: Stress Management, was released by Gameloft for mobile phones in 2007. Another sequel, Brain Challenge 3: Think Again!, was released by Gameloft for mobile, iPod Touch, iPhone in September 2009. In 2012, Brain Challenge 4: Breaking Limits was released for mobile phones.

See also
Brain Age and Brain Age 2
Brain Boost
English Training: Have Fun Improving Your Skills!
Flash Focus: Vision Training in Minutes a Day
Minna de Kitaeru Zenno Training
Professor Kageyama's Maths Training The Hundred Cell Calculation Method

References

External links
Official website

2007 video games
DSiWare games
Brain training video games
IPod games
IOS games
MacOS games
Mobile games
N-Gage service games
Nintendo DS games
PlayStation 3 games
PlayStation Network games
PlayStation Portable games
Puzzle video games
Ubisoft games
Video games developed in China
WiiWare games
Xbox 360 Live Arcade games
Wii games
Zeebo games
Gameloft games
Vivendi franchises
Multiplayer and single-player video games
Casual games
Video games scored by Jake Kaufman